Parliamentary elections will be held in Bulgaria on 2 April 2023 to elect members of the National Assembly. Initially scheduled to be held before November 2026, Rumen Radev, the president of Bulgaria, announced in January 2023 that he would call a snap election as no new government was able to be formed.

Background 

The National Assembly following the 2022 parliamentary election, which remained fragmented following the third snap election since 2021, was unable to form a governing coalition. Bulgarian Rise and Revival, which hold a combined 39 seats, are considered Eurosceptic and sympathetic to Russia, similarly to the Bulgarian Socialist Party (BSP) with 25 seats. GERB and the Movement for Rights and Freedoms do not have a majority, holding only 103 of the 121 seats needed. Although generally pro-EU, the remaining parties and alliances with seats have opposed Boyko Borisov's past government and have reportedly refused any possibility of a coalition with GERB due to disagreements over corruption.

On 18 October, Borisov announced that his attempts to broker a coalition government prior to the first sitting of the new Assembly were unsuccessful. The following day, the Assembly failed to elect a speaker during its first meeting, the first time this ever occurred. After multiple failed attempts, the Assembly elected its oldest member, the GERB MP Vezhdi Rashidov, as speaker on 21 October, after he was nominated by Korneliya Ninova, the leader of BSP, as a consensus candidate,.

The gridlock to form a new government persisted throughout October and November 2022 and before a first or second mandate was given, President Rumen Radev stated that he would delay handing over the third mandate for government formation until after the New Year so as to delay elections until March 2023 and avoid the most difficult winter period. On 2 December, Radev stated that he would hand the government mandate to the election's winner GERB the following Monday. On 5 December, Radev granted the first mandate to GERB's nominee, Nikolay Gabrovski. One week later, on 12 December, Gabrovski proposed a new government. His prime ministership was rejected by Parliament (113 "for", 125 "against", 2 absent) two days later on 14 December, with only MPs from the DPS and BV voting in favour alongside GERB. Radev later gave the mandate to Ninova, although she rejected to form a government in a deadlocked parliament. Observers already pointed at an unprecedented fourth snap election to be held in 2023, as no new government could be formed.

Electoral system 
The 240 members of the National Assembly are elected by open list proportional representation from 31 multi-member constituencies ranging in size from 4 to 16 seats. The electoral threshold is 4% for parties, with seats allocated according to the largest remainder method using a Hare quota. Radev dissolved the National Assembly on 3 February to schedule the election for 2 April 2023.

Parties

Parliamentary parties
The table below lists the political party groups represented in the 48th National Assembly.

Contesting parties and coalitions
Coalitions that registered to take part in the 2023 parliamentary election could change its composition or name by 25 February 2023, while until 28 February, the candidate lists could be registered to the Electoral Commission.

Campaign

Campaign slogans 

The following list present the official campaign slogans of some of the major parties contesting the Bulgarian parliamentary election:

Constitutional powers of the President 
Some political parties in Bulgaria have accused President Radev of meddling in political affairs, as well as internal party politics, which is in breach of the constitutional duties. BSP specifically, have consistently accused President Radev and Caretaker Cabinet of allegedly meddling in internal party affairs. BSP sent an official complain to the OSCE and PACE alleging illegal meddling by the caretaker government and President in their internal politics, as well as the election campaign after an interview by Justice Minister Krum Zarkov criticising the party leadership. The PP–DB coalition has also accused the president of meddling after Radev called them the "parties of war" referring to their support of sending arms to Ukraine.

ITN on the contrary believes that the president should have more powers compared to the current roles outlined in the constitution, even advocating for a transition to a presidential republic with ITN calling for a referendum to be held on the decision.

Magnitsky sanctions announcement 
On 10 February 2023, the United States announced a new group of sanctions based on the Magnitsky Act. The sanctions targeted former finance minister in the Second and Third Borisov Government, Vladislav Goranov, former energy minister in the Stanishev Government, Rumen Ovcharov, the leader of Russophiles for the Revival of the Fatherland, Nikolay Malinov, as well as two former heads of the Kozloduy Nuclear Power Plant. The group were accused of corruption, financial mismanagement and increasing Russian influence.

The announcement was a reminded about the issue of endemic corruption within Bulgaria's political class, as well as their close ties to Russia. The announcement provoked a range of differing reactions from political parties and politicians in Bulgaria. Caretaker Minister of the Interior, Ivan Demerdzhiev, characterised the sanctions as "slap in the face" of the Bulgarian judicial system, showing it to be incapable of rooting out corruption, while caretaker Deputy Prime Minister for European Union resources, Atanas Pekanov, and caretaker Justice Minister, Krum Zarkov, described it as a sign by the US that progress wasn't fast enough on the topic of judicial reform. A similar message was echoed by members of the PP–DB coalition, with DB member of parliament, Atanas Slavov, saying that the new packet of sanctions showed the failings of the current general prosecutor, Ivan Geshev, and that a link existed between GERB, DPS, and BSP due to the former or current connection of the sanctioned figures to those parties.

A more mixed reaction came from GERB and the BSP. Borisov insisted that the party had distanced itself away from Goranov, and claimed he had information that the United States was working on sanctions against PP co-leaders Petkov and Vasilev, for financial mismanagement during their time in office. Other GERB figures, like GERB member of parliament Toma Bikov, insist that evidence must be provided before any judgement can be made. BSP, of whom Rumen Ovcharov remains a member, gave a voice to Rumen Ovcharov at the recent Congress, at which he insisted he was innocent and that the sanctions were meant to worsen Russian-Bulgarian relations. Leader of Bulgarian Rise, Stefan Yanev, indicated that he did not believe that the new sanctions would have an impact on the upcoming election, calling it another "scandal" which undermined trust between political parties, he did, however, endorse the idea of a "thorough" judicial reform as long as it kept the judicial branch "independent".

Nikolay Malinov, the leader of the party Russophiles for the Revival of the Fatherland, which is contesting the elections as part of the "Neutral Bulgaria" coalition, insists that he has never received funding from Russia, as alleged by the sanctions, and that he is "proud" to be included in the list as it showed his opposition to US influence in Bulgaria.

Allegations of vote buying 

Minister of the Interior in the Caretaker Government, Ivan Demerdzhiev, announced on 17 February that he expects increased attempts at vote buying during this election campaign, with a meeting of Oblast Directors of the Ministry of Interior being dedicated to this topic.

Opinion polls 
Graphical representation of recalculated data

The opinion poll results below were recalculated from the original data and exclude polls that chose "I will not vote" or "I am uncertain" options.

Notes

References 

Bulgaria
Bulgaria
Parliamentary elections in Bulgaria